Cerace onustana is a species of moth of the  family Tortricidae. It is found in Nepal and India (Assam, Bengal).

The wingspan is 39–60 mm. The forewings are bluish black from the costa to the cell and from the dorsum to the fold, elsewhere suffused with dark ferruginous crimson. The hindwings are brightly golden yellow with velvety jet-black markings.

References

Moths described in 1863
Ceracini
Moths of Japan